The Pelican Bay Light (or Port of Brookings Light) is a small, privately owned lighthouse in Brookings, Oregon, United States. It overlooks the Port of Brookings Harbor and the mouth of the Chetco River. Built as an addition to an existing house, Pelican Bay Light is maintained by the Cady family of Brookings.

See also 
List of lighthouses on the Oregon Coast

References 

Lighthouses completed in 1997
Lighthouses in Oregon
Oregon Coast
Transportation buildings and structures in Curry County, Oregon
Brookings, Oregon
Curry County, Oregon